The Capricorn Assemblage, also known as the Capricorn Formation, is a geological formation comprising the central portion of the Mount Meager massif in southwestern British Columbia, Canada. It is named after Capricorn Mountain, the third highest subsidiary peak of Meager. The assemblage was formed during a period of volcanic activity about or less than 90,000 years ago.

Weathered rhyodacite is the main volcanic rock comprising the Capricorn Assemblage. It forms the final  of Capricorn Mountain and Mount Job. The rhyodacite is characterized by phenocrysts of plagioclase, quartz and biotite. Capricorn Assemblage rhyodacite underlies Plinth Assemblage rhyodacite on the south flank of Plinth Peak.

See also
Mosaic Assemblage
Job Assemblage
The Devastator Assemblage
Pylon Assemblage
Volcanism of Western Canada
List of Cascade volcanoes
List of volcanoes in Canada

References

Mount Meager massif
Volcanism of British Columbia
Geologic formations of British Columbia
Pleistocene volcanism